Springrange or Spring Range is  a rural locality in Yass Valley Shire, New South Wales, immediately to the north of the Australian Capital Territory. It is approximately 30 kilometres north of the Australian city of Canberra to the east of the Barton Highway.

The highest location is Mount Spring at 889 meters above sea level. It hosts a communications tower. The main road through the locality is Spring Range Road.

References

Localities in New South Wales
Yass Valley Council